Yussuf is a surname. Notable people with the surname include:

 Adi Yussuf (born 1992), Tanzanian footballer
 Ayila Yussuf (born 1984), Nigerian football player
 Bashir Yussuf (born  1905), Somali religious leader

See also
 Joseph
 Yusuf
 Yusuff
 Yussuff